Ramalodium is a lichenized genus of fungi within the Collemataceae family.

References

Peltigerales
Lichen genera
Peltigerales genera
Taxa named by William Nylander (botanist)